Aanchal is a 1960 Hindi movie directed by Vasant Joglekar. The film stars Ashok Kumar, Nirupa Roy, Nanda in lead roles. The music was composed by C. Ramchandra.

Cast
Ashok Kumar as Ramu 
Nirupa Roy as Janki
Nanda as Chanda
Sudesh Kumar as Inspector Sundar
Om Prakash as Constable Dharamdas
Lalita Pawar as Ramu's Mother
Dhumal as Laxmidas
Iftekhar as Mohan

Soundtrack

Awards and nominations

|-
| 1961
| Nanda
| Filmfare Award for Best Supporting Actress
| 
|}

References

External links

1960 films
1960s Hindi-language films
Films scored by C. Ramchandra